Liechtenstein competed at the 1992 Winter Paralympics in Tignes-Albertville, France. The country's delegation consisted of a single competitor, alpine skier Josef Gmeiner. Gmeiner competed in two events and did not win any medals.

Alpine skiing

See also
Liechtenstein at the 1992 Winter Olympics

References

Nations at the 1992 Winter Paralympics
1992 Winter
Paralympics